Rhampholeon viridis, the green pygmy chameleon, is a species of chameleons endemic to Tanzania.

References

Rhampholeon
Reptiles described in 2006
Taxa named by Colin R. Tilbury
Reptiles of Tanzania